Gordon Harris (1918–1965), was an English actor who appeared in films such as Murder, She Said (1961), Murder at the Gallop (1963), as well as The Navy Lark (1959).
Before beginning his acting career, Harris was a professional soldier and served as a Major in the British Army's Devonshire Regiment.

Selected filmography
 Border Incident (1949) – Bandit (uncredited)
 Forces' Sweetheart (1953) – 1st P.C.
 The Intimate Stranger (1956) – Actor (uncredited)
 Gideon's Day (1958) – CID Man (uncredited)
 I Was Monty's Double (1958) – Staff Sergeant (uncredited)
 The Navy Lark (1959) – Group Captain
 A Touch of Larceny (1960) – 2nd Special Branch Man Jones (uncredited)
 Murder, She Said (1961) – Bacon
 Murder at the Gallop (1963) – Sergeant Bacon

References

External links
 

1918 births
1965 deaths
English male film actors
Devonshire Regiment officers
British Army personnel of World War II
20th-century English male actors